This is a list of electricity-generating power stations in the U.S. state of Nevada, sorted by type and name.   In 2019, Nevada had a total summer capacity of 11,938 MW through all of its power plants, and a net generation of 39,890 GWh.  The corresponding electrical energy generation mix was 6.9% coal, 64.6% natural gas, 12.1% solar, 9.8% geothermal, 5.6% hydroelectric, 0.8% wind, and 0.2% biomass.

Small-scale solar including customer-owned photovoltaic panels delivered an additional net 680 GWh to Nevada's electricity grid in 2019.  This was seven times smaller than the amount generated by the state's utility-scale PV plants. 
Nevada ranks second in the nation as a producer of geothermal resources, and fourth as a producer of solar resources.

Fossil-fuel power stations
Data from the U.S. Energy Information Administration serves as a general reference.

Coal

Cancelled facilities:
 Ely Energy Center:  1,500–2,500 MW
 White Pine Energy Station:  1,590 MW

Natural gas

Renewable power stations
Data from the U.S. Energy Information Administration serves as a general reference.

Biomass

Geothermal

Hydroelectric

  Total generating capacity of the 17 turbines at Hoover dam was derated to 1,596 MW in June 2014 due to persistently low water storage levels and projected further declines.

Solar photovoltaic

As of February 2023, there are more than 30 proposed solar projects in Nevada. These have more than 20 GW of solar capacity and 17 GW of battery storage.

Solar thermal

Wind

References

 
Lists of buildings and structures in Nevada
Nevada
Geographic coordinate lists